Blood in the Water: The Attica Prison Uprising of 1971 and Its Legacy is the third book from the University of Michigan historian Heather Ann Thompson. The book provides the first complete history of the Attica Prison uprising of 1971 and details not only the events of the week-long uprising and its brutal ending, but also the protracted legal battles that persisted for decades after the event. Blood in the Water reflects Thompson's more than a decade of research, including information from interviews, government records, personal correspondence, and legal documents, much of which has never been made public before. Thompson argues that the Attica uprising and New York state's response represented shifting American approaches to incarceration and policy. The reverberations of this watershed event has continued to influence America's prison system. Film rights to the book have been optioned by TriStar Pictures though no release date has been confirmed.

Critical reception
Since its publication in 2016, Blood in the Water has been profiled by media outlets across the U.S., Europe, and Canada, and has received much critical praise. The book was featured and reviewed in three separate sections of The New York Times with one of the reviews calling it a "gripping...remarkable...a superb work of history" while another heralded its research, and the final one, a full-length piece in the NYT Book Review, lauding its passion and power. Reviews in other publications such as Newsweek and The Christian Science Monitor were equally glowing, with the latter calling the book "a masterpiece." The author, Heather Ann Thompson, was herself featured in The New York Times Magazine. In their review, the Brennan Center for Justice described how, "Thompson’s definitive account should be read by students, historians, and others who are interested not only in the riot itself, but in these larger subjects, and one more: the capacity of our legal system, after the fact, to right wrongs, and provide at least a modicum of justice." Lauren Brooke-Eisen, the reviewer, notes that the book, "contributes greatly to our understanding of this complex event by expertly filling in these details and weaving them into a comprehensive narrative." Additionally, Blood in the Water has won a number of book awards. In 2017, it was awarded the Pulitzer Prize for History, the Bancroft Prize in American History and Diplomacy, the Ridenhour Prize, and the J. Willard Hurst Award in Socio-Legal History, amongst others. Blood in the Water was a National Book Award Finalist in 2016, as well as a New York Times Most Notable Book, Publishers Weekly Top 10 Book of 2016, and received starred reviews at Kirkus Reviews, Publishers Weekly, and Library Journal.

Awards and honors
 Pulitzer Prize in History 2017
 Bancroft Prize in American History and Diplomacy 2017
 Ridenhour Book Prize 2017
 J. Willard Hurst Award in Socio-Legal History 2017
 Los Angeles Times Book Prize Finalist 2017
 Finalist Silver Gavel Award for Media and the Arts, Honorable Mention 2017
 New York City Bar Association Award 2016
 National Book Award Finalist 2016
 New York Times Most Notable Books of 2016
 Top Ten Best Books of 2016 Publishers Weekly
 Top Ten Best Works of Non-Fiction of 2016 Kirkus Reviews
 Top Ten Books of 2016 Newsweek

Book bans in prisons
Blood in the Water has been subject to bans in at least six U.S. state prison systems, including Arizona, Illinois, New Hampshire, New York, Ohio, and Texas. The author filed lawsuits against the state prison systems of Illinois and New York on account of the bans. Thompson was represented in the New York case by Cardozo School of Law's Civil Rights Clinic; the New York Department of Corrections and Community Supervision lifted its ban in the face of legal pressure in August 2022.

References

2016 non-fiction books
21st-century history books
Imprisonment and detention in the United States
Attica Correctional Facility
Pulitzer Prize for History-winning works
Works about American prisons
Bancroft Prize-winning works
Books about imprisonment
Pantheon Books books